Richard W. Abbe (January 6, 1926 – September 3, 2000) was an Associate Justice of the California Second District Court of Appeal, Division Six from 1982 to 1990, having been appointed to the post by Governor Jerry Brown.

Born in Paris, France, Abbe was in the U.S. Navy from 1943 to 1946, including during World War II.  After his discharge, he attended Stanford University, where he received an A.B. in 1950 and an LL.B. from the University of California, Hastings College of the Law in 1953.  From 1954 to 1959, Abbe was an attorney in Hollister, California.  From 1960 to 1962, he was a Deputy California Attorney General based in Shasta County.  From 1962 to 1965, Abbe was the District Attorney of Shasta County.

In 1965, Governor Pat Brown appointed Abbe to the Shasta County Superior Court, where he stayed until Brown's son, Governor Jerry Brown, appointed Abbe to the California Second District Court of Appeal, Division Six in 1982.  Abbe retired in 1990 and died in Berkeley, California in 2000. His sister is the author, Patience Abbe.

References

External links
Official biography of Richard W. Abbe

1926 births
2000 deaths
French emigrants to the United States
People from Hollister, California
People from Shasta County, California
Stanford University alumni
University of California, Hastings College of the Law alumni
Judges of the California Courts of Appeal
20th-century American judges
United States Navy personnel of World War II
United States Navy sailors